Oakshott is a hamlet in the East Hampshire district of Hampshire, England. It lies one mile (1. 6 km) south of the village of Hawkley and 2.5 miles (4 km) north of Petersfield.

The nearest railway station is Petersfield, 2.5 miles (4 km) south of the hamlet.

External links
 

Villages in Hampshire